Gary Bauress (born 19 January 1971) is an English footballer, who played as a midfielder in the Football League for Tranmere Rovers.

Personal life
Bauress is the father of the footballer Joe Bauress.

References

External links

Tranmere Rovers F.C. players
Stalybridge Celtic F.C. players
Association football midfielders
English Football League players
Living people
1971 births
English footballers
Footballers from Liverpool